Thrips hawaiiensis is a species of thrips. It is a pest of sorghum in Asia.

References

hawaiiensis
Insect pests of millets